Hammersmith South was a borough constituency in the Metropolitan Borough of Hammersmith in west London.  It returned one Member of Parliament (MP) to the House of Commons of the Parliament of the United Kingdom, elected by the first-past-the-post system.

The constituency was created when the Hammersmith constituency was divided for the 1918 general election.  It was abolished for the 1955 general election.

Boundaries 
1918–1950: The Metropolitan Borough of Hammersmith wards numbers one, two and three.

1950–1955: The Metropolitan Borough of Hammersmith wards of Addison, Broadway, Brook Green, Grove, Olympia, Ravenscourt, and St Stephen's.

Members of Parliament

Election results

Elections in the 1910s

Elections in the 1920s

Elections in the 1930s

Elections in the 1940s

Elections in the 1950s

References 

Parliamentary constituencies in London (historic)
Constituencies of the Parliament of the United Kingdom established in 1918
Constituencies of the Parliament of the United Kingdom disestablished in 1955
Politics of the London Borough of Hammersmith and Fulham